E-Novation is an Australian software company incorporated in 2002 that, according to International Data Corporation, was the first software as a service (SaaS) enterprise performance management application in the Asia-Pacific Region.

Awards and recognition
In 2007 E-Novation was awarded Honourable Mention for the ZDNet Emerging Technology Innovation Award, alongside Salesforce.com.

In 2007 the company was deemed by BPM Partners Inc. as being compliant with BPM2.0, the next generation of BI/BPM applications.

In 2006 the company was selected as a Red Herring Asia 100 Regional Finalist.

In 2005 E-Novation was selected as a Winner of the Australian Consensus Award.

In 2005 E-Novation was selected as one of three National Finalists for the Australian Information Industry Association (AIIA) iAward in the 'Financial Applications' category.

References

External links
 E-Novation Corporate Homepage

Software companies established in 2002
Software companies of Australia
Australian companies established in 2002